The Beatsteaks are a German rock band from Berlin, formed in 1995.

History
Peter Baumann, Stefan Hircher, Alexander Rosswaag and Bernd Kurtzke founded Beatsteaks in 1995. Shortly afterwards, Arnim Teutoburg-Weiß joined the band as singer and additional guitarist. In 1996, the band won a local music competition in SO36 and played as opening act for the Sex Pistols at a concert in Berlin. This was also the band's tenth live performance.

In 1997, the band recorded their first album 48/49, named after the number of their rehearsal space. It contains several songs in German, while the more recent albums are in English. In 1999 they released their second album, Launched, on the American punk label Epitaph Records. Thomas Götz had joined the band on drums, while on bass, Torsten Scholz replaced Alexander in 2000. This was followed by tours with Bad Religion, Die Ärzte and Die Toten Hosen, bringing the band to a wider audience.

In 2002, they released their third album Living Targets. From this album, Beatsteaks released their first two singles "Let Me In" and "Summer". At the end of 2002, the band played a concert at the Columbiahalle in Berlin and recorded the EP Wohnzimmer. Ticket holders for the Berlin concert each received a 'free' copy of the EP.

German band Die Ärzte mentioned the Beatsteaks in their 2003 song "Unrockbar", which brought increased attention to the Beatsteaks: "Wie kannst du bei den Beatsteaks ruhig sitzen bleiben, wenn dir doch Schlagersänger Tränen in die Augen treiben?" ("How can you remain unmoved by the Beatsteaks, while Schlager singers bring tears to your eyes?").

Their breakthrough was achieved in Berlin in 2004 with the album Smack Smash, and particularly with the second single "I Don't Care as Long as You Sing" with which they won the MTV European Music Awards 2004 in the category Best German Act. At the end of 2005, they released the double DVD B-Seite, which included a self-produced documentary on the band's history, a compilation of several concerts, and music videos of the band up to this point. In 2006, they played a short summer tour, consisting of three concerts and two festival performances. Following the release of the preliminary single "Jane Became Insane" on 9 March 2007, their fifth album, .limbo messiah, appeared on 30 March 2007.

On 7 June 2007, the band played a concert for a charity foundation, as part of the Deine Stimme gegen Armut (literally "Your voice against poverty") campaign in Rostock in front of a 70,000 strong audience. One month later, on 7 July 2007, they played in the sold-out Wuhlheide in Berlin, their then-largest headlining concert, in front of approximately 17,000 fans.

In 2007, the Beatsteaks were again nominated in the category Best German Act at the EMAs and won the audience prize 1Live Krone for the best live act.

On 2 May 2008, the live album Kanonen auf Spatzen was released, which includes two CDs and one DVD in the deluxe package, or the first CD in an economy version.

Torsten Scholz said in an interview that the Beatsteaks would start writing new songs after the end of their Limbo Messiah tour in August 2008.

The Beatsteaks completed work on their most recent album Boombox, which was released on 28 January 2011. The first single from the album was "Milk & Honey", released on 2 December. On 8 April 2011, the second single, "Cheap Comments", was released. The third single off Boombox was "Automatic", co-written by Peter Fox.

In June 2011, the band announced their song "House on Fire" was to be featured on the European soundtrack of Transformers: Dark of the Moon.

In 2013, the band released the live CD/DVD Muffensausen. On 15 May 2014, they released the song "DNA" as the first single of their record Beatsteaks, which was released on 1 August 2014. "Gentleman of the Year" and "Make a Wish" are also two singles that have been released from the self-titled record.

In 2015, the Beatsteaks celebrated their 20th anniversary with two concerts at the Kindl-Bühne Wuhlheide in Berlin.

Band members

Current members
 Arnim Teutoburg-Weiß - lead vocals, rhythm guitar (1995–present)
 Bernd Kurtzke - lead guitar, vocals (1995–present)
 Peter Baumann - rhythm guitar, lead guitar, vocals, keyboard (1995–present)
 Thomas Götz - drums, percussion, vocals (1998–present)
 Torsten Scholz - bass guitar (2000–present)

Touring members
 Dennis Kern - percussion, drums (2012–present)

Former members
 Alexander Rosswaag - bass guitar (1995–2000)
 Stefan Hircher - drums, percussion (1995–1998)

Side projects
Beatsteaks drummer Thomas Götz, and Marten Ebsen, guitarist of Turbostaat, started the project NinaMarie. Their first EP was released under the name Scheiss. Taxi-Scheiss. Paris in March 2006.

Another Beatsteaks side project, involving all of the band members and emerging during the recordings of the album Limbo Messiah, is the cover band Die Roys. Swapping musical instruments and under the direction of Roy Baumann (Peter Baumann), they cover known songs, which are, according to their statement, "the best songs already written". The first five songs can be found on the singles "Jane Became Insane", "Cut Off the Top" and "Demons Galore".

Discography

Studio albums
 1997: 48/49
 2000: Launched
 2002: Living Targets
 2004: Smack Smash   
 2007: .limbo messiah  
 2011: Boombox
 2014: Beatsteaks
 2017: Yours

Compilation album
 2015: 23 Singles

Live albums
 2008: Kanonen auf Spatzen
 2013: Muffensausen

EPs
 1998: 6-11-98 Knaack, 6 November; Ticket for a concert in the "Knaack" (Berlin). The EPs (vinyl) are limited.
 2002: Wohnzimmer-EP, 21 December; as well limited, Ticket for a concert in the "Columbiahalle" (Berlin).
 2007: .demons galore. 5 October; 10" vinyl and CD.

Singles
 2000: "Panic"
 2000: "Shiny Shoes"
 2002: "Summer"
 2002: "Let Me In"
 2004: "Hand in Hand"
 2004: "I Don't Care as Long as You Sing"
 2004: "Hello Joe"
 2004: "Loyal to None" (limited vinyl single)
 2007: "Jane Became Insane"
 2007: "Cut Off the Top"
 2007: "Demons Galore"
 2007: "Meantime"
 2008: "Hail to the Freaks" (live)
 2008: "Hey du" (live)
 2010: "Milk & Honey"
 2011: "Cheap Comments"
 2011: "Automatic"
 2011: "House on Fire"
 2013: "SaySaySay"
 2014: "DNA"
 2014: "Gentleman of the Year"
 2014: "Make a Wish"
 2015: "Ticket"
 2017: "Hate to Love" (feat. Jamie T)

Music videos
 Atomic Love [Live] (2004)
 Hello Joe (2004)
 Hello Joe [Live] (2004)
 Frieda und die Bomben [Live] (2004)
 Hand in Hand (2004)
 I Don't Care as Long as You Sing (2004)
 Jane Became Insane (2007)
 Cut Off the Top (2007)
 Demons Galore (Ver. 1) (2007)
 Demons Galore (Ver. 2) (2007)
 Meantime (2007)
 Milk & Honey (2010)
 Cheap Comments (2011)
 Automatic (Ver. 1) (2011)
 Automatic (Ver. 2) (2011)
 House on Fire (2011)
 Say Say Say (2013)
 French Disco (2016)
 40 Degrees (2017)
 I do (2017)
 L auf der Stirn (2017)

DVD
 2004: Beatsteaks Live (bonus DVD, limited edition of Smack Smash enclosed)
 2005: B-Seite (2-DVD set)
 2007: .demons galore (bonus DVD, limited edition of .limbo messiah enclosed)
 2008: Kanonen auf Spatzen (bonus DVD)
 2013: Muffensausen (live DVD/live album)

Awards
 2004: MTV Europe Music Awards 2004 – Best German Act
 2007, 2008: 1LIVE Krone – Best Live Act
 2011: VIVA Comet – Best Video (Milk & Honey)
 2011: MTV Europe Music Awards 2011 – Best German Act (nominated)
 2011: 1Live Krone – Best Band

References

External links

Official website
[ Beatsteaks] on AllMusic

Epitaph Records artists
German rock music groups
German punk rock groups
Musical groups established in 1995
Musical groups from Berlin
MTV Europe Music Award winners